Microzargus is a genus of beetles in the family Carabidae, containing the following species:

 Microzargus hartmanni Sciaky & Facchini, 1997
 Microzargus nepalensis Sciaky & Facchini, 1997
 Microzargus schmidti Sciaky & Facchini, 1997
 Microzargus sichuanus Sciaky & Facchini, 1997

References

External links
 iNaturalist

Licininae